Ildar Mukhometov (born September 21, 1972) is a Russian former professional ice hockey goaltender.

References

External links

1972 births
Living people
Ice hockey people from Moscow
Barys Nur-Sultan players
Hannover Scorpions players
HC CSKA Moscow players
HC Dynamo Moscow players
HC Neftekhimik Nizhnekamsk players
Krylya Sovetov Moscow players
Russian ice hockey goaltenders
Severstal Cherepovets players